Profanity in the Japanese language can pertain to scatological references or aim to put down the listener by negatively commenting on their ability, intellect, or appearance. Furthermore, there are different levels of Japanese speech that indicate politeness, social standing and respect, referred to, simply, as honorific form (敬語 keigo). Using the incorrect form of Japanese can itself be insulting to the listener.

Language-based profanity 

In Japanese culture, social hierarchy plays a significant role in the way one speaks to the various people they interact with on a day-to-day basis. Choice on level of speech, politeness, body language and appropriate content is assessed on a situational basis, and intentional misuse of these social cues can be offensive to the listener in conversation.

Pronouns and suffixes 
Pronouns are rarely used in Japanese compared to English. Rather, a Japanese speaker would refer to another individual, whether it be in the second person or third person, by their family name. However, when referring to an individual, the use of suffixes on pronouns can be used to indicate levels of politeness.

For example, in English one could say "Excuse me, Ms Ishiyama, but I cannot hear you. Could you please speak louder?", the following would be an incorrect translation:

(1) 石山先生、すみませんが私はあなたを聞こえません。あなたはもっと大きい声で話してくれませんか？ (Ishiyama-sensei, sumimasen ga watashi wa anata wo kikoemasen. Anata wa motto ōkī koe de hanashitekuremasenka?)

Japanese exhibits pronoun avoidance, meaning that using pronouns is often too direct in Japanese, and considered offensive or strange. One would not use pronouns for oneself, 私 ('I'), or for another, あなた ('you'), but instead would omit pronouns for oneself, and call the other person by name:

(2) 石山先生、すみませんが、聞こえません。もっと大きい声で話してくれませんか？ (Ishiyama-sensei, sumimasen ga, kikoemasen. motto ōkī koe de hanashitekuremasenka?)

The use of 'Ishiyama' instead of her first name and the use of 'sensei' (teacher) as a suffix indicates recognition of Ms. Ishiyama's superiority in the social hierarchy as one's teacher.

In contrast, if one were to say:

(3) ごめん、聞こえない。もっと大きい声で言って。(gomen, kikoenai. motto ōkī koe de itte)

to their teacher, it would be considered incredibly impolite. Ms Ishiyama's status is not mentioned, indicating that the speaker considers themself to be of equal or high social standing.

Honorific language 
Profanity can be accentuated also through use (or lack) of honorific language (敬語 けいご keigo). Following on from pronouns and suffixes in the example above, the speaker has contracted the words for 'excuse me/sorry' (すみません sumimasen to ごめん gomen), 'I cannot hear you' (聞こえません kikoemasen to 聞こえない kikoenai) and 'can you speak' (話してくれませんか hanashitekuremasenka to 言って itte).

Politeness can be conveyed to the listener by conjugating plain forms (verb stems) of Japanese verbs into what is called the polite form.

Consider the original example. The plain form verb for 'listen' is 聞く kiku. The potential form of this is 聞こえる kikoeru, and the corresponding negative form is 聞こえない kikoenai. The polite conjugation of the negative potential plain form is then 聞こえません kikoemasen, as seen in the example (1). In example (3) the speaker has chosen to use the plain form 聞こえない kikoenai, and this indicates a disregard for the social hierarchical status of Ms Ishiyama over the speaker.

Bowing 
Bowing was introduced into Japanese culture c. 500–800 CE, possibly alongside the introduction of Chinese Buddhism into the country. Bowing when greeting another person has become a large part of Japanese culture and there are specific customs that are followed to show humility and respect in situations including business meetings, formal occasions, and day-to-day interactions. When performing a  standing bow (正立 seiritsu) to another Japanese speaker, the individual's back should remain straight, with their hands by their side, and eyes averted to the ground. From sitting, the individual should be seated on their knees (正座 seiza) with their hands forming a triangle on the floor in front of them, and head moving towards the hands. The bow does not need to be held for extended time, however the action should not be rushed either. The speed in which the bow is performed, as a result, can infer levels of politeness or rudeness.

The depth of the bow performed by an individual changes the meaning of the bow. A bow of 15 degrees is considered a casual bow or greeting bow (会釈 eshaku). This sort of bow can be used with someone of equal social hierarchical status such as a colleague or friend's friend. A bow of 30 degrees is considered a polite bow (浅礼 senrei) and should be made from seiza, not from seiritsu. This sort of bow is used in semi-formal situations. A bow of 45 degrees is a respectful bow (敬礼 keirei) and can be done while seated or standing. The respectful bow is used when greeting a superior such as an employer, or in-laws. Finally, a deep bow of greater than 45 degrees is called a reverent bow (最敬礼 saikeirei) and this is reserved either for an audience with the emperor or to communicate a deep reverence or regret.

With regards to profanity, using an overly polite or reverent form of bowing can display sarcasm and disdain, and conversely, choosing an inappropriately familial bow can be offensive to the other party.

Vocabulary
Not all words on the list are profanities, and the list has been accused of excessively limiting freedom of speech by bowing to political correctness (in Japanese, kotobagari). For example, the name of professional wrestler Bobo Brazil has at times been censored because , an obscure dialectal term for "vagina", is on the list.

Sex 
Similar to English, profanities that relate to the body tend to refer to the direct words for body parts and may not necessarily be negative words.

Male profanities

 くそじじい kusojijii – old fart, old hag (unpleasant old man)
 どインポ do'inpo – impotent
ちんぽこ chinpoko – dick, penis, prick
ちんちん chinchin – pre-pubescent penis, willy
ちんぽ chinpo – penis
ぽこちん pokochin – penis
まら mara – penis

Female profanities

あばずれ abazure – bitch
 やりまん yariman – slut
 くそばばあ kusobabaa – old fart, old hag (unpleasant old woman)
まんこ manko – vagina, cunt
おまんこ omanko – vagina, screw, vaginal intercourse
われめ wareme – slit, vagina, cunt
われめちゃん waremechan – slit, vagina, cunt (same as wareme with the cutesy suffix 'chan')
おめこ omeko – vagina, vaginal intercourse

Neutral profanities

 変態 (へんたい) hentai – perverted, pervert
 スケベ sukebe – lech, lecher
 いやらしい iyarashii – disgusting, lewd, indecent
下衆野郎 (げすやろう) gesuyarou – asshole

Insults

Common Japanese insults 

くたばれ kutabare – drop dead, fuck you
しんじまえ shinjimae – die, go to hell
くそくらえ kuso kurae – eat shit
くそったれ kusottare – (literally) shit-drip
きさま kisama – rude pronoun 'you'
てめえ  temee – rude pronoun 'you'
手前 (てまえ) temae – rude pronoun 'you'
こいつ、あいつ koitsu, aitsu – rude, overly familiar expression for a third party
このやろう kono yarou – you bastard (generally directed at men)
やつ, やつめ yatsu, yatsume – unpleasant, disliked person
ちくしょう chikushō – oh shit, damn it, oh hell
やかましい, じゃかまし~ yakamashii, jakamashi~ – shut up
うるさい, うざい urusai – shut up (literally: 'noisy, annoying')
最低 (さいてい) saitei – the worst, disgusting
め me – suffix that implies contempt
屁こき (へこき) hekoki – farter

Stupidity 

 あほ (アホ) aho – idiot, moron, fool, asshole
 馬鹿 (ばか) baka – idiot, moron, fool, asshole
 馬鹿野郎 (ばかやろう) baka yarō – idiot, moron, fool, asshole
 まぬけ manuke – clueless, loser (literally 'missing a beat', 'out of rhythm')
 のろま noroma – slowpoke, twit, daft
 へたくそ hetakuso – clumsy, lacking skill
 どじ doji – clumsy, clueless
 ぼけ boke – clueless, unaware, dumb, stupid
 とろい toroi – slow-witted, doesn't get it

Personality/people 

くそがき kusogaki – bad-mannered child, brat
 わるがき warugaki – brat
でぶ debu – fatso, fatty
 ぶす busu – ugly
 ちび chibi – runt, shorty
くちきたない kuchikitanai – bad mouthed, bitchy
けち kechi – stingy, mean
ずるい zurui – selfish, unfair
ダサい/ださい dasai – unfashionable, lame
くそまじめ kusomajime – overly serious, 'goody-two-shoes'
ヲタク otaku – creepily obsessive (usually for computer or pop-culture geeks, also used to describe oneself as a hardcore fan of anime, games and manga)
意地悪 (いじわる) ijiwaru – malicious, spiteful, bitchy
やぼ yabo – coarse, impolite, disrespectful
弱虫 (よわむし) yowamushi – weak, cowardly (literally 'weak insect')
腰抜け (こしぬけ) koshinuke – coward
嘘つき (うそつき) usotsuki – liar
キモい/きもい kimoi (short for 気持ち悪い, kimochi warui) – disgusting, gross　
ウザイ uzai (short for うるさい, urusai) – annoying, noisy

Racial euphemisms 
Japan has managed to preserve its culture, which was highly influenced by Chinese culture, through isolation from other countries. Prior to the World Wars, Japan had unstable relationships with the nations surrounding them, including Korea and China. Following the World Wars, Japanese civilization experienced exposure to Western culture, and this resulted in a range of insults with regards to nationality, race, and place of origin.

 異人 (いじん) ijin – foreigner, another person
 異邦人 (いほうじん) ihōjin – foreigner, stranger
 毛唐 (けとう) ketō – foreigner, alien, newcomer, stranger, non-native
 他国人 (たこくじん) takokujin – foreigner, stranger, alien
 チョン chon – Korean person
 キムチ野郎 (きむちやろう) kimuchiyarō – Korean person (Literally, Kimchi Person)
特亜人 (とくあじん) tokuajin – abbreviation of "Tokutei Asian". A term used to describe  those from countries with strong anti-Japanese sentiment, specifically Koreans and Chinese.
 三国人 (さんごくじん) sangokujin - lit. "third country person", referring to Koreans and Taiwanese in Japan, particularly those after WW2

Homosexuality 
 お釜 (おかま) okama – (literally) pot, slang for gay man, especially refers to cross-dressers
 お鍋 (おなべ) onabe – (literally) pot, slang for gay woman
 レズビアン rezubian – lesbian
 レズ rezu – lesbian

References 

Profanity by language
Profanity